Vasile Sansiro Ciocoi (born 4 February 1976) is a former Romanian professional footballer. He was part of one of the best football generation of CSM Reșița with players like Leontin Doană, Sandu Roco or Cristian Chivu. His name Sansiro is inspired by the San Siro stadium from Milan.

References

External links
 

1976 births
Living people
Romanian footballers
People from Bocșa
CSM Reșița players
FC Progresul București players
CS Unirea Sânnicolau Mare players
FC U Craiova 1948 players
CSM Jiul Petroșani players
Liga I players
Liga II players
Association football midfielders